Lyubov Alexeyevna Mukhachyova (born July 23, 1947 in Staraya Russa) is a Soviet former cross-country skier who competed during the early 1970s for Trud Voluntary Sports Society. She won a gold medal at the 1972 Winter Olympics in Sapporo in the 3 × 5 km relay and also finished fourth in the 10 km and sixth in the 5 km at those same games.

Cross-country skiing results
All results are sourced from the International Ski Federation (FIS).

Olympic Games
 1 medal – (1 gold)

References

External links
 
 
 

1947 births
Living people
People from Staraya Russa
Soviet female cross-country skiers
Russian female cross-country skiers
Olympic cross-country skiers of the Soviet Union
Olympic gold medalists for the Soviet Union
Cross-country skiers at the 1972 Winter Olympics
Olympic medalists in cross-country skiing
Medalists at the 1972 Winter Olympics
Sportspeople from Novgorod Oblast